Henry C. Slusher (May 10, 1846 - March 12, 1923) was a private in the United States Army who was awarded the Medal of Honor for actions performed on 11 September 1863 at Moorefield, West Virginia.

Personal life 
Slusher was born on May 10, 1846, in Washington County, Pennsylvania.

Military service 
Slusher enlisted as a private in the Army on 14 October 1862 and was mustered into Company F of the 22nd Pennsylvania Cavalry. Later, while serving with Troop E of Ringgold's Independent Volunteer Cavalry, he participated in an ambush against a group of Mosby's Guerillas who had taken 146 Union soldiers prisoner in a prior engagement. After spotting his messmate William P. Hagner amongst the prisoners, he charged across the river and engaged the Confederates in hand-to-hand combat. He was eventually taken prisoner and was kept in Libby Prison in Richmond, Virginia.

Slusher's Medal of Honor citation reads:

He was mustered out of the Army on 19 July 1865.

Death
He died on March 12, 1923, in Washington, Pennsylvania and was buried in Lone Pine Cemetery, Amwell Township, Pennsylvania.

References

1846 births
1923 deaths
People of Pennsylvania in the American Civil War
Union Army personnel